Merrill Greene Wheelock (1822–1866) was an artist and architect in Boston, Massachusetts in the 19th century. He served in the Massachusetts infantry in the American Civil War.

Biography
Wheelock exhibited at the Boston Art Club (1857) and the Boston Athenaeum.  Among his early supporters was James Elliot Cabot. Wheelock was especially known for watercolors: he "has a local reputation of being our best painter in that department, his pictures being full of brilliant color." In 1852 he kept a studio on Tremont Row, and in 1858 on Summer Street.

In 1865 Wheelock designed the architecture of Boston's new Masonic Temple, which would move a few blocks down Tremont Street, from Temple Place to the corner of Boylston Street. Illness prevented him from completing the design, finished by architect George F. Meacham and built in 1867.

One of Wheelock's watercolor landscape paintings appeared in the 1881 exhibit of the Boston Art Club. A contemporary reviewer commented: "Wheelock is almost forgotten, although it is not so very many years since he died. But this watercolor shows that he has well-grounded claims upon our remembrance. It will certainly be better for his fame to know him by his paintings, than by such architectural absurdities as the Masonic Temple."

Image gallery

See also
 Henry Goulding House, Worcester, Mass. (built 1850)

References

Further reading

Works illustrated by Wheelock
 Thomas Starr King. The White Hills: their legends, landscape, and poetry. N. Conway, N.H.: I.N. Andrews, 1859. Engravings by John Andrew, from drawings by M.G. Wheelock.
 Edward H. Rogers. Reminiscences of military service in the Forty-third regiment, Massachusetts infantry, during the great Civil war, 1862-63. Boston: Franklin press, Rand, Avery, & co., 1883

Works about Wheelock
 Appletons' annual cyclopaedia and register of important events: Embracing political, military, and ecclesiastical affairs; public documents; biography, statistics, commerce, finance, literature, science, agriculture, and mechanical industry, Volume 6. D. Appleton and company, 1867; p. 582.
 Samuel L. Gerry. Old Masters of Boston. New England Magazine, v.3, no.6, Feb. 1891.
 George C. Groce and David H. Wallace. The New-York Historical Society's Dictionary of Artists in America, 1564-1860. New Haven, CT: Yale University Press, 1957.
 Sinclair Hamilton. Early American Book Illustrators and Wood Engravers, 1670-1870: A catalogue of a collection of American books illustrated for the most part with woodcuts and wood engravings in the Princeton University Library. Princeton, NJ: Princeton University Press, 1958-1968.

External links

 WorldCat. Wheelock, Merrill G. 1822-1866
 Wheelock Family Genealogy

1822 births
1866 deaths
Artists from Boston
Architects from Boston
19th century in Boston
Union Army soldiers
19th-century American architects